Manikhira is a village near Thakurnagar in Gaighata CD Block in Bangaon subdivision of the North Twenty Four Parganas district in the West Bengal state of India.

Geography
It is situated 9.1 km away from CD Block/ sub-district headquarters Gaighata and 42.8 km away from district headquarters Barasat.

Demographics
As per the 2011 Census of India, Manikhira had a total population of 2,898, of which 1,474 (51%) were males and 1,424 (49%) were females. Population below 6 years was 238. The total number of literates in Manikhara was 2,111 (79.36% of the population over 6 years).

Transport
It is on the Thakurnagar-Ramchandrapur Road, which links Manikhira to NH 112 (Jessore Road). The nearest railway station is at Thakurnagar.

Healthcare
Chandpara Rural Hospital, the main medical facility in Gaighata CD Block, is located at Thakurnagar. The Bhaduria primary health centre at Ramchandrapur is located nearby.

References

Villages in North 24 Parganas district